Hecatombe may refer to
The Greek hecatomb sacrifice
The stage name of Mexican professional wrestler Máscara Sagrada
A disaster of planetary scale: an extinction event.